Galeya may be,

Galeya language
Abhin Galeya, British stage and screen actor